White Horse Tavern may refer to:

United Kingdom
 White Horse Tavern, Cambridge, an alleged meeting place for English Protestant reformers

United States
 White Horse Tavern (Boston, Massachusetts)
 White Horse Tavern (New York City), known for its association with poet Dylan Thomas
 White Horse Tavern (Coatesville, Pennsylvania)
 White Horse Tavern (Douglassville, Pennsylvania)
 White Horse Tavern (East Whiteland Township, Pennsylvania)
 White Horse Tavern (Newport, Rhode Island), constructed before 1673, believed to be the oldest tavern building in the U.S.

See also
 
 White horse (disambiguation)
 White Horse Hotel (disambiguation)
 The White Horse Inn (disambiguation)
 White Horse Farm, Phoenixville, Pennsylvania, listed on the NRHP in Eastern Chester County
 White Horse Historic District, Willistown Township, Pennsylvania, listed on the NRHP in Eastern Chester County
 White Horse Pike Historic District, Haddon Heights, New Jersey, listed on the NRHP in Camden County
 White Horse Ranch (Naper, Nebraska), listed on the NRHP in Boyd County